Young Liberal Democracy (MLD) is the youth party of the Slovene political party Liberal Democracy of Slovenia. MLD is a national liberal youth organisation.

The members of MLD started with work on 1 February 1991. The members are engaging themselves on the national as well as the local level, they are taking an active part in the work of the central party.

Mlada liberalna demokracija is also connected with related foreign organisations. Full members status is held by IFLRY, LYMEC, ISEEL and UNITED.

Structure 
MLD's highest body is the Congress, which meets at least every second year. It adopts MLD's political platform, the Manifesto, and decides about MLD's activities. These are stated in a one-year Programme of Action. Furthermore, the Congress elects the President and decides upon the budget.

The Council is composed from at least one representative from each local committee; from one representative from each regional committee and the Bureau. It meets three times per year. Furthermore, the Council elects all the other Bureau members.

The MLD Bureau consists of a President, Vice-President, a Secretary General, an International Secretary, an Organisational Secretary, and five Bureau members. The Bureau has the responsibility for MLD's day-to-day management and is elected every two years.

Leadership

Mandate 2011 - 2013

Mandate 2009 - 2011

See also
Liberalism
Liberalism worldwide
List of liberal parties
Liberal Democracy of Slovenia, Mother party
LYMEC, the European Liberal Youth, related to the European Liberal, Democrat and Reform Party
IFLRY, International Federation of Liberal Youth

External links
Young Liberal Democracy Official site
Mlada liberalna demokracija Wikipedija

Liberal parties in Slovenia